Königsfelden Monastery is a former Franciscan double monastery, which housed both a community of Poor Clare nuns and one of Franciscan friars, living in separate wings, in the municipality of Windisch in the canton of Aargau in Switzerland.  It was founded in 1308 by the Habsburgs. In the course of the Protestant Reformation in Switzerland in 1528 it was secularized, and the complex was then the residence of the bailiffs of Bern.

Since 1868 the former monastic buildings have served as a psychiatric clinic.  The monastery church was converted into a museum in 2009. It contains a set of 14th-century stained glass windows which, together with the windows in the Cathedral of Bern, are considered the most valuable in Switzerland.

History

On May 1, 1308, King Albert I of Germany was murdered by his nephew John Parricida in the community of Windisch. The monastic complex centered around the contemplative life of the nuns, while the small community of friars tended to both their spiritual needs and that of the surrounding community.

Albert and Elisabeth’s oldest daughter, Agnes of Austria, the widow of King Andrew III of Hungary, moved to Königsfelden in 1317 and helped it to thrive, but did not join the monastery.

With the conquest of the Western Aargau by the city of Bern, the monastery lost its connection with the Habsburg family.  It was abolished in the course of the success of the Reformation in Switzerland in 1528.  The complex then served as the seat of the Bernese bailiffs of the Königsfelden district, a steward took over the administration of former monastic property.

In 1804 the former monastery became the property of the canton of Aargau, which had been founded in the year before.  The new canton established a mental hospital. In 1872 a new building was built and since 1887 it has been a psychiatric clinic.  During the construction a large part of the Franciscan monastery was demolished.

Abbesses
1310-1313 Elizabeth of Carinthia
about 1313  Hedwiga von Kuntzlau
1318-1324 Guta von Bachenstein
1329    Benigna von Bachenstein
about 1330 Agnes of Austria
about 1334 Adelheid I
about 1355  Elisabeth I von Leiningen
about 1371 Anna I von Goldenberg
1374-1383 Irmengard von Hohenberg
about 1405  Adelheid II von Hallwyl
1406-1408 Margaretha I von Wachingen
1411-1415 Margaretha II von Grünenberg
1416-1456 Elisabeth II von Leiningen
about 1456 Ursula von Mirlingen
about 1459 Eva von Erpach
about 1471 Osanna Jäger
1472-1492 Apollonia von Hohenberg
1497-1506 Anna II von Stein
1511-1513 Emerita Lutschern
1516-1528 Katherina von Waldburg

Burials 

Elizabeth of Carinthia, Queen of the Romans
Leopold the Glorious, Duke of Austria, and his wife, Catherine of Savoy
Henry the Friendly and his wife, Elizabeth of Virneburg
Agnes of Austria, Queen of Hungary
Elizabeth of Austria, Duchess of Lorraine
Jutta of Austria, Countess of Öttingen

References

External links

Burial sites of the House of Habsburg
Christian monasteries in Switzerland
Buildings and structures in Aargau
Franciscan monasteries
Poor Clare monasteries
Museums in Aargau
Monuments and memorials in Switzerland
Christian monasteries established in the 14th century
14th-century establishments in Switzerland
1308 establishments in Europe
1528 disestablishments in Europe
16th-century disestablishments in the Old Swiss Confederacy
Gothic architecture in Switzerland
Churches in Aargau